Melonie Haller (born ca. 1959) is an American actress known for her role as Angie Grabowski on the television comedy series Welcome Back, Kotter during its third season (1977–78). Before Kotter, Haller had small uncredited roles in The Love Machine and The French Connection, both 1971. Haller appeared in the March 1980 issue of Playboy magazine.

Crime victim

On April 12–13, 1980, Haller attended a dinner party at the Southampton, Long Island home of film producer Roy Radin. Haller had been introduced to Radin by photographer Ronald Sisman, and visited his home hoping to revive her stalled acting career. The day after the party, Haller was discovered on a commuter train to Manhattan, unconscious and bloodied. She claimed  to have been beaten and raped during the party at Radin's home, and further alleged that the crimes had been filmed by Radin and/or others in attendance. Radin claimed that Haller had consented to sexual games during the party.

The Haller case was widely covered by the New York City press. In 1981, businessman Robert McKeage pleaded guilty to assaulting Haller, and was sentenced to 30 days imprisonment.

References

External links

American film actresses
Living people
1950s births
Place of birth missing (living people)
American television actresses